Metropolitan of Kyiv is an episcopal title that has been created with varying suffixes at multiple times in different Christian churches, though always maintaining the name of the metropolitan city — Kiev (Kyiv) — which today is located in the modern state of Ukraine. The church (Ancient Greek: Ρωσική Ορθόδοξη Εκκλησία, Rhosike Orthodoxe Ekklesia) was canonically established and governed by the Ecumenical Patriarch of Constantinople in Kievan Rus'. Following the Council of Florence and the Union of Brest, there are now parallel apostolic successions: in the Russian Orthodox Church, the Orthodox Church of Ukraine, the Ruthenian Uniate Church and its successors. This list contains the names of all the metropolitan bishops (hierarchs) who have claimed the title. It is arranged chronologically and grouped per the claimed jurisdiction.

Patriarchate of Constantinople

 "Michael I and Leontius", 988(?)–1004(?) 
 Theophylact, 988–1018
 John, 1008(?)–1017(?) 
 Teopempt 1037(?)–1043(?) 
 "Cyril" (information about him appeared only no earlier than the 16th century)
Hilarion 1051–(?) 
 Ephraim, 1055(?)–(?) 
 George, 1072(?)–(?) 
 John II Prodrom, 1077(?)–1089 
 John III, 1090–1091 
 Nicholas, 1097–1101(?) 
 Nikephoros, 1104–1121 
 Nikita, 1122–1126 
 Michael, 1130(?)–1145(?) 
Clement, 1147–1159
 Constantine, 1156–1159 
 Theodore, 1161–1163 
 John IV, 1164–1166 
 Costantine II, 1167–1177(?) 
 Michael II,
 "John V (?)–(?)" 
 Nikephoros II, 1182(?)–1197(?) 
 Matthew, 1210(?)–1220 
 Cyril, 1224–1233 
 Joseph I, 1237–(?) 
 "Peter (Akerovich)", 1241–1246 (Archbishop of Ruthenia), never confirmed by the Patriarch

Metropolitans of Kiev in other Rus' Principalities

The Metropolitans of Kiev are the predecessors of the Patriarch of Moscow and all Rus' that was formed in the 16th century.   After Lithuanian expansion in the west, the metropolis was moved.
Cyril II, 1250–1281 
Maximus, 1283–1299

Consecrated as Metropolitan of Kyiv and Vladimir in 1283, Metropolitan Maximus moved to Vladimir in 1299.

 Peter, 1308–1326

Metropolitan Peter moved the Metropolis of Kiev and all Rus' to Moscow in 1325.

Division of the Metropolis of Kiev and all Rus'

In the 14th century, Emperor Andronikos II Palaiologos sanctioned the creation of two additional metropolitan sees: the Metropolis of Halych (1303) and the Metropolis of Lithuania (1317).

Metropolitan Roman (1355–1362) of Lithuania and Metropolitan Alexius of Kiev both claimed the see. Both metropolitans travelled to Constantinople to make their appeals in person. In 1356, their cases were heard by a Patriarchal Synod. The Holy Synod confirmed that Alexis was the Metropolitan of Kiev while Roman was also confirmed in his see at Novogorodek. In 1361, the two sees were formally divided. Shortly afterwards, in the winter of 1361/62, Roman died. From 1362 to 1371, the vacant see of Lithuania–Halych was administered by Alexius. By that point, the Lithuanian metropolis was effectively dissolved.

Following the signing of the Council of Florence, Metropolitan Isidore of Kiev returned to Moscow in 1441 as a Ruthenian cardinal. He was arrested by the Grand Duke of Moscow and accused of apostasy. The Grand Duke deposed Isidore and in 1448 installed own candidate as Metropolitan of Kyiv — Jonah. This was carried out without the approval of Patriarch Gregory III of Constantinople. When Isidore died in 1458, he was succeeded as metropolitan in the Patriarchate of Constantinople by Gregory the Bulgarian. Gregory's canonical territory was the western part of the traditional Kievan Rus' lands — the states of the Grand Duchy of Lithuania and the Kingdom of Poland. The episcopal seat was in the city of Navahrudak which is today located in Belarus. It was later moved to Vilnius — the capital of the Grand Duchy of Lithuania. A parallel succession to the title ensued between Moscow and Vilnius.

In the Holy See
An Ecumenical council of the Church — the Council of Florence — took place from 1431 to 1449. Although he resisted at first, the Grand Prince of Moscow — Vasily II of Moscow — eventually permitted the Metropolitan of Kiev and all Rus' —  Isidore of Kiev — to attend the council. Isidore, who was of Greek origin, submitted to the articles of the Bull of Union with the Greeks which united the Eastern Orthodox Church with the Holy See. The Great Prince of Moscow voided the union in his lands and imprisoned Isidore for some time. In September 1443, after two years of imprisonment, Metropolitan Isidor escaped to Tver, then to Lithuania and on to Rome. He was graciously received by the pope in 1443. Pope Nicholas V (1447–1455) sent him as legate to Constantinople to arrange the reunion there in 1452, and gave him two hundred soldiers to help the defence of the city.

 Gregory II, (1458–1473). His title to the metropolitan see was acknowledged both by the Holy See and by the Ecumenical Patriarchate of Constantinople.
 Misail Pstruch, 1476–1480  – his election was accepted by Casimir IV Jagiellon (King of Poland and Grand Duke of Lithuania), after he agreed to adhere to the Union of Florence. He was appointed by Pope Sixtus IV.
, 1476–1482  – consecrated as Orthodox metropolitan of Kyiv by Patriarch Raphael I of Constantinople but rejected by Casimir IV

Patriarchate of Constantinople (1481–1599) 

Following the Fall of Constantinople, the Union of Florence disintegrated. The patriarchy of Constantinople resumed the Eastern Orthodox succession of the Metropolis of Kiev and all Rus' with Simon of Kiev. Simon's tenure was challenged by the anti-Eastern Orthodox sentiments of the King of Poland Casimir IV Jagiellon and the 1482 plundering of Kiev by the Crimean Khan Mengli Giray, an ally of the Grand Prince Ivan III of Moscow.

 Simeon of Kiev, 1481–1488  – first accepted Orthodox metropolitan since 1458
 Jonah Hlezna, 1489–1494 
 , 1495–1497 
 , 1499–1501 
 , 1503–1507 
 , 1509–1522 
 , 1523–1533 
 , 1534–1555 
 , 1556–1567 
 , 1568–1577 
 , 1577–1579 
 , 1579–1589 
 Michael III, 1589–1599

In 1595, most Eastern Orthodox leaders in the Metropolis of Kiev and all Rus' signed the Union of Brest with the Holy See, thereby establishing the Ruthenian Uniate Church.

In the Holy See (Union of Brest)
Following the failure of the Union of Florence, a second attempt at union was essayed in 1595/6. It resulted in the Union of Brest which re-established full communion with the Holy See. The effect was to create the Ruthenian Uniate Church. This is a list of Metropolitans of Kiev, Galicia and all Ruthenia in the Ruthenian Uniate Church before the partitions of Poland:
 1596—1599 Michael III
 1600—1613 Hypatius Pociej
 1613—1637 Joseph Rutski
 1637—1640 Raphael Korsak
 1641—1655 Antonius Sielawa
 1666—1674 Gabriel Kolenda
 1674—1693 Cyprian Żochowski
 1694—1708 Leo Załęski
 1708—1713 George Winnicki
 1714—1729 Leo Kiszka
 1729—1746 Athanasius Szeptycki
 1748—1762 Florian Hrebnicki
 1762—1778 Philip Wołodkowicz
 1778—1779 Leo Szeptycki
 1780—1786 Jason Smogorzewski
 1787—1805 Theodosius Rostocki

Patriarchate of Constantinople (Exarchate of Ukraine)

Some clergy in the Commonwealth refused to subscribe to the Union of Brest and continued with the old rites and their allegiance to the Ecumenical Patriarch. More than 25 years of struggles within parishes for possession of church buildings and monasteries ensued. In 1620, the patriarch of Jerusalem — Theophanes III — entrenched the schism by establishing an "Exarchate of Ukraine" for those dissenting clergy and laity who refused to conform to the union. Parallel successions to the title of "Metropolitan of Kiev, Galicia and all Ruthenia" continued until 1686. In that year, the Patriarchate of Moscow uncanonically assumed the right to consecrate the Kiev metropolitans; from that time onwards, the metropolis became a creature of Moscow.

List of metropolitans of the "Exarchate of Ukraine":
 Job (1620–1631)
 Isaiah (1631–1633) 
 Peter III (1633–1646) who was the first metropolitan to be recognized by the Crown of Poland
 Sylvester (1647–1657)
 Dionisius II (1657–1663) who transferred the episcopal seat from Kyiv to Chyhyryn due to Muscovite military incursions 
 Joseph V, 1663–1675 
 Anton Vinnicky, (anti-Metropolitan) 1663–1679 
 vacant 1679–1685

Appointed by Romanov civil authorities (residence in Kyiv):
 Locum Tenens Lazar Baranovych,  1659–1661 
 Locum Tenens Methodius Filimonovich, 1661–1668 
 Locum Tenens Lazar Baranovych,  1670–1685

In the Patriarchate of Moscow

Metropolitans of Kyiv, Galicia and of all Little Rus (1685–1770)
 

According to the Russian Orthodox Church, the ecclesiastical jurisdiction of the Greek Orthodox metropolis was transferred from the Ecumenical Patriarchate to the Moscow Patriarchate in 1686. This interpretation is disputed by the Orthodox Church of Ukraine (see 2018 Moscow–Constantinople schism).
 Gedeon Chetvertinsky, 1685–1690  (Former bishop of Lutsk, Gedeon Chetvertinsky was elected by the sobor initiated by the Hetman Ivan Samoilovych and later went for consecration to Moscow instead of Constantinople)
 Metropolitan Varlaam, 1690–1707 
 Ioasaph, 1708–1718 
In 1718 Peter the Great abolished metropolitan.
 Archbishop Varlaam, 1722–1730,  archbishop
 Raphael, 1731–1747, metropolitan since 1743
In 1743 metropolitan was reinstated.
 Timothy, 1748–1757 
 Arsenius, 1757–1770 
In 1767 Catherine the Great stripped the Metropolitan Arsenius of title "of all Little Rus"

Metropolitans of Kyiv and Galicia (1770–1921)
In 1770, the Romanov civil authorities stripped the metropolis of its suffragan sees. The title became an honorific with no practical sense of governing an ecclesiastical territory beyond its own geographic remit. This is a list of bishops who retained this empty title:
 Gabriel, 1770–1783 
 Samuel, 1783–1796 
 Hierotheus, 1796–1799 
 Gabriel II, 1799–1803 
 Serapion, 1803–1822 
 Eugene, 1822–1837 
 Philaret, 1837–1857 
 Isidore, 1858–1860 
 Arsenius II, 1860–1876 
 Philotheus, 1876–1882 
 Platon, 1882–1891 
 Joanicius, 1891–1900 
 Theognostus, 1900–1903 
 Flavian, 1903–1915 
 Vladimir, 1915–1918 
 Nicodemus, 1918 (as bishop of Chyhyryn)
 Anthony, 1918–1919  When of Gen. Pyotr Wrangel′s White Army was defeated in South Russia in November 1920, Anthony emigrated. In 1921 he settled down in Sremski Karlovci, Serbia. Along with several other Russian bishops in exile, he established an independent Russian church administration that sought to embrace all Russian Orthodox diaspora, known as the Russian Orthodox Church Outside Russia (ROCOR).
 Nazarius Blinov, 1919–1921

Metropolitans and Archbishops of Kyiv and Galicia (1921–present)

Bishops in communion with the Patriarchate of Moscow (1921–present)

The Russian Orthodox Church erects exarchates which have a limited autonomy within a defined geographical territory (e.g. Belarusian Exarchate). Such an exarchate was erected for Kyiv in 1921. This is a list of exarchs of the Patriarchate of Moscow to date: 
 Michael Yermakov, 1921–1925, bishop in 1921–27 exarch of Ukraine 1921–1929
 Georges Deliev, 1923–1928,  bishop acting
 Macarius Karamzin, 1924,  bishop acting
 Sergius Kuminsky, 1925–1930,  bishop acting
 Demetrius Verbitsky, 1930–1932,  archbishop
 Sergius Grishin, 1932–1934,  archbishop
 Constantine Dyakov, 1934–1937, exarch of Ukraine 1929–1937
 Alexander, 1937–1938 
 Nicholas Yarushevich, 1941–1944, exarch of Ukraine 1941
 During World War II, the Ukrainian Soviet Socialist Republic was occupied by Nazi Germany. Exarch Nicholas moved to Moscow. The rest of bishops loyal to the Moscow Patriarchate created the Ukrainian Autonomous Orthodox Church (UAOC) which was recognized by Metropolitan Nicholas. When the German armies retreated from the SSR, the UAOC was dissolved; the exarchate was reinstated.
 Oleksii Hromadskyi, 1941–1943 (Ukrainian Autonomous Orthodox Church)
 Panteleimon Rudyk, 1943–1944 (Ukrainian Autonomous Orthodox Church)
 John Sokolov, 1944–1964, exarch of Ukraine
 Ioasaph II, 1964–1966, exarch of Ukraine
 Filaret II, 1966–1990, exarch of Ukraine
In 1990, the Russian Orthodox Church accorded a limited form of self rule to the Ukrainian Exarchate. The additional freedoms were not enumerated. The church is currently styled the "Ukrainian Orthodox Church (Moscow Patriarchate)" (UOC-MP). The metrpolitan is styled "Metropolitan of Kyiv and all Ukraine". There have been three metropolitans of the UOC-MP to date:

Filaret Filaret II (1990–1992) Following differences with the Patriarchate, he left  and joined the newly formed Ukrainian Orthodox Church – Kyiv Patriarchate. In 1997, he was excommunicated by the Moscow Patriarchate.
Volodymyr II Sabodan (1992–2014)
Onufriy Berezovsky, 2014–incumbent

Bishops not in communion with the Patriarchate of Moscow (1923–present)
In 1923, a split occurred in the Patriarchate of Moscow. A majority (initially) of bishops associated themselves with a wing of the Church that was supported by the OGPU (the Soviet secret police). A minority, called "The Living Church", was spread across the territory of the USSR. Many episcopal sees in the 1920s and 1930s had 2 parallel bishops: one from the Living Church, another from the Moscow Patriarchate. The Living church had its headquarter in Kharkiv and was active in the Ukrainian Soviet Socialist Republic.

 Tikhon (Vasilevsky), 1923
 Nikolay (Fedotov), 1923–1924
 Aleksandr (Shcherbakov), 1924
 Innokentiy (Pustynsky), 1924–1929
 Iuvenaliy (Moshkovsky), 1928–1929
 Pimen (Pegov), 1929–1935
 Aleksandr (Chekanovsky), 1935–1937
 Vladimir (Zlobin), 1938–1941

Metropolitan of Kyiv and All Ukraine (self-consecrated)
 Vasyl Lypkivsky, 1921–1927
 Mykola Boretsky, 1927–1930 
 Ivan Pavlovsky, 1930–1936 

All-Ukrainian Orthodox Autocephalous Synodical Church
Created in 1923, the church was part of all-Soviet Renovation movement (Obnovlenichestvo). It was liquidated in 1935, but after the remaining communities were headed by acting primate.

 Pimen (Pegov), 1923-1935
 Oleksandr (Chekanovskyi), 1935-1937

Fraternal Parish Association of the Ukrainian Orthodox Autocephalous churches
In 1925 there was created another organization which opposed both the Living Church and Ukrainian Autocephalous Orthodox Church. After 1937 it disappeared.

 Feofil Buldovsky, 1925–1937

Polish Orthodox Church period (World War II)
In 1942, UAOC was re-established with help of the Polish Orthodox Church during occupation of Ukraine by the Nazi Germany. Polikarp Sikorsky was consecrated by Dionizy (Waledyński).
 Polikarp Sikorsky, (Administrator of the Church under the title of Metropolitan of Lutsk and Kovel), 1942–1944 
In 1944 the Orthodox Metropolitan of Warsaw, Dionizy Waledynski, was appointed "Patriarch of All Ukraine", but the Soviet Union did not allow any operation in Ukraine.

Patriarchs of Kyiv and all Rus' (Ukrainian Orthodox Church – Kyiv Patriarchate)
Patriarch Mstyslav (Stepan Ivanovych Skrypnyk) was the Patriarch of Kyiv and all Rus' and the primate of the Ukrainian Autocephalous Orthodox Church (UAOC) and the Ukrainian Orthodox Church (Kyiv Patriarchate) (UOC–KP) from 1991 to 1993. After Mstyslav's death in 1993, the temporary union ended; the Ukrainian Orthodox Church – Kyiv Patriarchate and the Ukrainian Autocephalous Orthodox Church separated. After being dismissed in 1992 by the Archhierarch Synod of the Ukrainian Orthodox Church, the Ukrainian Metropolitan Filaret joined the UOC–KP under Patriarch Mstyslav. The primates of the Ukrainian Orthodox Church–Kyiv Patriarchate continue to style themselves as patriarch:
 Mstyslav (1991–1993)
 Volodymyr (1993–1995)
 Filaret II Denysenko (1995–2018; 2019–present) (see Conflict between Filaret and Epiphanius)

Metropolitans of Kyiv and All Ukraine (Ukrainian Autocephalous Orthodox Church)
In 1989 the Ukrainian Autocephalous Orthodox Church was legally registered in the Ukrainian SSR. This was made possible by the President Gorbachev's policies of Perestroyka. Previously, only the Russian Orthodox Church in Moscow  was allowed to function in Ukraine. It was not in communion with the Patriarchate of Moscow. It was disestablished in 2018. It had four metropolitans during that time:
 Mstyslav (1991-1993)
 Dymytriy (1993-2000)
 Mefodiy Kudriakov (2000–2015)
 Makariy Maletych (2015–2018)

On 15 December 2018, the UAOC along with the UOC–KP merged into the unified Orthodox Church of Ukraine.

Autocephalous Orthodox Church of Ukraine

The Orthodox Church of Ukraine (OCU) was established by a unification council on 15 December 2018. The council voted to unite the existing Ukrainian Orthodox churches (UOC-KP, UAOC and parts of the UOC-MP) through their representatives, on the basis of complete canonical independence. The primate of the Church is styled the "Metropolitan of Kyiv and all Ukraine". The unification council elected Epiphanius I as its first primate. The Church was officially granted autocephaly on 5 January 2019 by decree of the Ecumenical Patriarch, Bartholomew I.

In June 2019, however, Filaret and a few clergymen split from the UOC, in a dispute over the leadership of the Church.

As of December 2019, the OCU is recognized by the Ecumenical Patriarchate of Constantinople, the Patriarchate of Alexandria, the Church of Greece, and the Church of Cyprus.

This is a list of Metropolitans of Kyiv and all Ukraine:
Epiphanius I, 2018–incumbent

See also
Bishop of Kyiv (disambiguation)
Roman Catholic Diocese of Kyiv-Zhytomyr

Notes

Citations

References

External links
List of Orthodox Metropolitans of Ukraine
 Ukrainian Orthodox Church (Moscow Patriarchate) website
Київські митрополити (до 1708 року) 
Madey, J. History of the Ukrainian church. Encyclopedia of Ukraine

 
Ukraine
History of the Russian Orthodox Church
 
Kiev
Ukraine religion-related lists
History of Christianity in Ukraine
Eastern Orthodoxy in medieval Russia